The Campina thrush (Turdus arthuri) is a bird in the genus Turdus native to the Amazon biome. It was previously considered conspecific with the black-billed thrush.

Distribution and habitat
The species is the most common Turdus thrush of disturbed habitats in west central Amazonia and on the Guianan Shield, occurring in Brazil, Colombia, Guyana, Suriname, and  Venezuela. It inhabits a variety of habitats including clearings, savannas with gallery woodland, cerrado, humid forest borders, coffee plantations, and various other habitats under anthropogenic influence.

References

Campina thrush
Birds of Venezuela
Birds of the Guianas
Birds of the Brazilian Amazon
Birds of the Venezuelan Amazon
Campina thrush